Olga Votavová (born 10 July 1966) is a Czech former professional tennis player.

Born in Cheb, Votavová played on the professional tour during the 1980s and reached a best singles ranking of 169 in the world.

Votavová was runner-up at the Swedish Open in 1985, prior to the tournament becoming part of the main tour. Her best performance on the Virginia Slims circuit instead came at the Bregenz in 1986, where she made it to the quarter-finals.

ITF finals

Singles: 4 (2–2)

Doubles: 4 (2–2)

References

External links
 
 

1966 births
Living people
Czech female tennis players
Czechoslovak female tennis players
People from Cheb
Sportspeople from the Karlovy Vary Region